"Confessin' My Love" is a song co-written and recorded by American country music artist Shawn Camp.  It was released in November 1993 as the second single from the album Shawn Camp.  The song reached #39 on the Billboard Hot Country Singles & Tracks chart.  The song was written by Camp and John Scott Sherrill.

Mark Chesnutt covered the song on his 2000 album Lost in the Feeling.

Chart performance

References

1993 singles
1993 songs
Shawn Camp (musician) songs
Songs written by Shawn Camp (musician)
Songs written by John Scott Sherrill
Song recordings produced by Mark Wright (record producer)
Reprise Records singles
Mark Chesnutt songs